Queen Live at Wembley Stadium, also referred to as Queen Live At Wembley, Queen At Wembley, Queen Live At Wembley '86, Live At Wembley and Live At Wembley '86, is a recording of a concert at the original Wembley Stadium, London, England on Saturday 12 July 1986 during Queen's Magic Tour and transmitted and released in various audio and video forms (including the Queen: Live at Wembley Stadium DVD).

Transmission and release history

The recorded concert was first seen as a ‘The Tube Special’ on TV. This was transmitted in mono (as was normal before NICAM stereo became standard on UK TV in the early 1990s). However, it was simultaneously broadcast over the radio in stereo so that viewers had the option to mute their televisions, play the audio on a nearby radio and enjoy “the world’s first ever stereo simulcast” in a similar way that previous live (as opposed to, in this case, pre-recorded) classical performances had sometimes been offered.

The recording was first commercially released in December 1990 as an edited VHS (missing 9 songs), then as the Live at Wembley '86 audio CD in 1992. This was followed by a DVD release as Queen: Live at Wembley Stadium (in its entirety) to coincide with the CD rerelease in 2003. The DVD has gone five times platinum in the United States, four times platinum in the United Kingdom, and achieved multi platinum status around the world. On 5 September 2011, the 25th Anniversary Edition of the concert was released as a standard 2-DVD set and a deluxe 2-DVD and 2-CD set which also included the entire Friday 11 July 1986 concert on DVD for the first time. Eagle Rock Entertainment released a 25th Anniversary Edition in the US and Canada on 12 March 2013.

Disc one
 One Vision
 Tie Your Mother Down
 In the Lap of the Gods... Revisited
 Seven Seas of Rhye
 Tear It Up
 A Kind of Magic
 Under Pressure
 Another One Bites the Dust
 Who Wants to Live Forever
 I Want to Break Free
 Impromptu
 Brighton Rock Solo
 Now I'm Here
 Love of My Life
 Is This the World We Created?
 (You're So Square) Baby I Don't Care
 Hello Mary Lou
 Tutti Frutti
 Gimme Some Lovin'
 Bohemian Rhapsody
 Hammer to Fall
 Crazy Little Thing Called Love
 Big Spender
 Radio Ga Ga
 We Will Rock You
 Friends Will Be Friends
 We Are the Champions
 God Save the Queen

Disc two

Road to Wembley
 Brian May and Roger Taylor interview (2003) (28 mins)
 Gavin Taylor (Director) and Gerry Stickells (Tour Manager) interview (19 mins)
 A Beautiful Day – Rudi Dolezal's backstage documentary about the whole day (30 mins)
 Tribute to the Wembley Towers – including timelapse demolition footage set to 'These Are the Days of Our Lives (Instrumental)' (5 mins)

Unseen Magic
 Features 'Friday Concert Medley' – highlights package of the previous night's show (28 mins):
 A Kind of Magic
 Another One Bites The Dust
 Tutti Frutti
 Crazy Little Thing Called Love
 We Are The Champions (ending)
 God Save The Queen
 Rehearsals (10 mins)
 Picture Gallery (5 mins) (The background music for this extra is the full, unreleased original version of "A Kind of Magic" used in the Highlander film)

Queen Cams
4 tracks presented in multi-angle Brian, Roger, John and Freddie cams:
 One Vision
 Under Pressure
 Now I'm Here
 We Are the Champions

Audio
PCM Stereo & DTS 5.1 Surround Sound

The Original Concert
The original concert started at 4.00pm with tickets costing £14.50, Four bands performed in the following order:
 INXS
 The Alarm
 Status Quo
 Queen

Charts

Charts

Certifications and sales

References

External links
 

Queen (band) video albums
Live albums recorded at Wembley Stadium
1990s English-language films

fr:Live at Wembley '86 (album)